Sprattus is a genus of small oily fish of the family Clupeidae. They are more usually known by their common name, sprats. There are five species in the genus.

Species 
 Sprattus antipodum (Hector, 1872) (New Zealand blueback sprat)
 Sprattus fuegensis (Jenyns, 1842) (Fueguian sprat)
 Sprattus muelleri (Klunzinger, 1879) (New Zealand sprat)
 Sprattus novaehollandiae (Valenciennes, 1847) (Australian sprat)
 Sprattus sprattus (Linnaeus, 1758) (European sprat)
The most common species of Sprat that is discussed in research is the Sprattus sprattus, mostly because of its prevalence in the Baltic Sea.

Notes

References 
 
 Tony Ayling & Geoffrey Cox, Collins Guide to the Sea Fishes of New Zealand,  (William Collins Publishers Ltd, Auckland, New Zealand 1982) 

 
Clupeinae
Marine fish genera